John Komnenos Angelos Doukas Synadenos was a Byzantine noble and military leader with the rank of megas stratopedarches during the reigns of Michael VIII Palaiologos (r. 1259–1282) and Andronikos II Palaiologos (r. 1282–1328).

Biography
Synadenos appears in 1276/1277, when, along with the megas konostaulos Michael Kaballarios, he led an army against the independent ruler of Thessaly, John I Doukas. The Byzantine army was routed at the Battle of Pharsalus, and Synadenos himself was captured, while Kaballarios was killed whilst trying to escape. He was released or ransomed from captivity, and in 1281 he participated in the campaign against the Angevins in Albania which led to the Byzantine victory at Berat. Finally, in 1283, he participated in another campaign against John Doukas, under Michael Tarchaneiotes.

Eventually, Synadenos retired to a monastery with the monastic name Joachim. After his death (sometime between 1310 and 1328), his wife, Theodora Palaiologina, the daughter of Constantine Palaiologos, the half-brother of Michael VIII, became a nun with the name Theodoule, and founded the Convent of the Mother of God Bebaia Elpis ("Certain Hope") in Constantinople. The convent's typikon (the so-called "Lincoln College typikon"), authored largely by Theodora, includes lavish depictions of the family's members.

Family
With Theodora, John had four children, who were reportedly all young when he died:
John Synadenos, megas konostaulos.
Euphrosyne Synadene, who was pledged to become a nun since infancy, and was the second founder of the Bebaia Elpis along with her mother.
An unnamed daughter, once reportedly considered as a possible bride for the Bulgarian tsar Theodore Svetoslav.
Theodore Synadenos, protostrator, he played a major role in the Byzantine civil wars of the first half of the 14th century.

References

Sources

13th-century births
14th-century deaths
Byzantine generals
13th-century Byzantine people
Eastern Orthodox monks
John 1
Michael VIII Palaiologos
Megaloi stratopedarchai